John of Berry (1375/1376–1397), count of Montpensier (1386–1401), was a French nobleman. He was the son of John, Duke of Berry and Joanna of Armagnac. He had no children and predeceased his father.

He married twice:
in 1386 at Saint-Ouen to Catherine of France (1378 † 1388), daughter of Charles V and of Joanna of Bourbon
in 1390 to Anne de Bourbon-La Marche (1380–1408), daughter of John I, Count of La Marche and Vendôme, and  Catherine de Vendôme.

References

Sources

1376 births
1397 deaths
House of Valois
House of Bourbon-Montpensier
Counts of Montpensier